Murarisaha or Murarisha Chowmatha (most of the time it is used) is a village and a gram panchayat in the Hasnabad CD block in the Basirhat subdivision of the district of North 24 Parganas in the state of West Bengal in India.

Etymology
Murarisha is a mixed or hybrid word but it is related to a specific person. Here something can be guessed about this short word murarisha. The word 'murari' is an ancient part of a person's names  often used those time to identify their  majority of great work and powerful strength like such a word Sultan. And the second part of this word 'sha' is the title of name of a person  to identify the cast and class.

Geography

Location

It is a junction of four roads and thus joining of this four side roads it has been called Chowmatha. Chowmatha is stood on a proper market of this great junction.

Area overview
The area shown in the map is a part of the Ichhamati-Raimangal Plain, located in the lower Ganges Delta. It contains soil of mature black or brownish loam to recent alluvium. Numerous rivers, creeks and khals criss-cross the area. The tip of the Sundarbans National Park is visible in the lower part of the map (shown in green but not marked). The larger full screen map shows the full forest area. A large section of the area is a part of the Sundarbans settlements. The densely populated area is an overwhelmingly rural area. Only 12.96% of the population lives in the urban areas and 87.04% of the population lives in the rural areas.

Note: The map alongside presents some of the notable locations in the subdivision. All places marked in the map are linked in the larger full screen map.

Weather
The weather of Murarisha is similar to other places in West Bengal, with a tropical climate, specifically a tropical wet and dry climate(Aw) under the Köppen climate classification, with seven months of dryness and peak of rains in July. The cooler season from December to February is followed by the summer season from March to June. The period from June to about the end of September constitutes the south-west monsoon season, and October and November form the post-monsoon season. Between June and September, the south west monsoon rains lash the village. Pre-monsoon showers are received in May. Occasionally, north-east monsoon showers occur in October and November.

The maximum annual rainfall ever recorded was 1500 mm for every year. The highest rainfall recorded in a single day was 850 mm. The average total annual rainfall is 1500 mm. The average annual temperature is 32 °C, and the average maximum temperature is 35 °C, while the average minimum temperature is 28 °C. In the summer the temperature is up to 35 °C, but in winter it drops to approximately 10 °C. Annual rainfall is about 1500 mm.

Geographical state
It belongs to Presidency division. It is located 55 km towards East from District headquarters Barasat. It is also 65 km from State capital Kolkata.

Demographics
As per 2011 census it had a population of about 5659 persons living in around 1006 households.

For language and religion information see Hasnabad

Transport
Murarisha can be reached through various ways. It can be reached from major city Kolkata through Taki road. Murarisha is just 11 km from Basirhat railway station. Hasnabad railway station, Taki Road Railway Station are the nearby railway stations to Murarisha village. However Sealdah and  Howrah Junction railway stations are major railway stations 65 km near Murarisha. Netaji Subhas Chandra Bose International Airport is 54 km from Murarisha. It also can be reached from Kolkata by bus from Razabazar CTC stands. These buses run through the Ghatakpukur-Malanchow-Chowmatha line, which takes just over two hours.

References

Villages in North 24 Parganas district